Justin Case may refer to:

 Pen name of Hugh B. Cave (1910–2004), an American writer
 Pen name of Rupert Gleadow (1909-1974), a British lawyer and legal writer 
 Justin Case (film), a 1988 television film
 Justincase, an American band

See also
Just in Case (disambiguation)